Jeepers Creepers may refer to: 

 "Jeepers creepers", a minced oath substitute for the phrase "Jesus Christ"
 "Jeepers Creepers" (song), a popular 1938 song 
 Jeepers Creepers (1939 live-action film), a 1939 film starring Roy Rogers
 Jeepers Creepers (1939 animated film), a 1939 animated short film featuring Porky Pig
 Jeepers Creepers (film series), a film series originally created by Victor Salva
 Jeepers Creepers (2001 film), a 2001 horror film written and directed by Victor Salva and the first film in the series

See also
 "Jeepers, Creepers, Where is Peepers?", a season-three episode of Dexter's Laboratory